Glypheidea is an infraorder of lobster-like decapod crustaceans, comprising a number of fossil forms and the two extant (living) genera Neoglyphea and Laurentaeglyphea: The infraorder was thought to be extinct until a living species, Neoglyphea inopinata, was discovered in 1975. They are now considered "living fossils", with over 256 fossil species discovered, and just two extant species.

Phylogeny
Glypheidea belongs to the clade Reptantia within the order Decapoda, although its exact placement within Reptantia is difficult to determine. Some phylogenetic studies consider Glypheidea to be most closely related to the infraorder Astacidea, which consists of the lobsters and crayfish, whereas other studies instead consider Glypheidea to be more closely related to the infraorder Polychelida, a group of deep-sea blind lobsters.

Taxonomy

Glypheoidea Winckler, 1882
† Chimaerastacidae Amati, Feldmann & Zonneveld, 2004
† Chimaerastacus Amati, Feldmann & Zonneveld, 2004
Glypheidae Winckler, 1882
† Cedrillosia Garassino, Artal & Pasini, 2009
† Glyphea  von Meyer, 1835
Laurentaeglyphea Forest, 2006
† Litogaster von Meyer, 1847
Neoglyphea Forest & de Saint Laurent, 1975
† Paralitogaster Glaessner, 1969
† Squamosoglyphea Beurlen, 1930
† Trachysoma Bell, 1858
† Mecochiridae Van Straelen, 1924
† Huhatanka Feldmann & West, 1978
† Jabaloya Garassino, Artal & Pasini, 2009
† Mecochirus Germar, 1827
† Meyeria M'Coy, 1849
† Praeatya Woodward, 1869
† Pseudoglyphea Oppel, 1861
† Selenisca von Meyer, 1847
† Pemphicidae Van Straelen, 1928
† Pemphix Meyer, 1840
† Pseudopemphix Wüst, 1903
† Sinopemphix Li, 1975
† Platychelidae Glaessner, 1969
† Glaessnericaris Garassino & Teruzzi, 1993
† Platychela Glaessner, 1931
† Platypleon Van Straelen, 1936
† Erymoidea Van Straelen, 1924
† Erymidae Van Straelen, 1924
† Clytiella Glaessner, 1931
† Clytiopsis Bill, 1914
† Enoploclytia M'Coy, 1849
† Eryma von Meyer, 1840
† Galicia Garassino & Krobicki, 2002
† Lissocardia von Meyer, 1851
† Palaeastacus Bell, 1850
† Paraclytiopsis Oravec, 1962
† Protoclytiopsis Birshtein, 1958
† Pustulina Quenstedt, 1857
† Stenodactylina Beurlen, 1928

References

 
Arthropod infraorders